HistoryMiami Museum, formerly known as the Historical Museum of Southern Florida, is a museum located in Downtown Miami, Florida, United States. HistoryMiami Museum is the largest history museum in the State of Florida. HistoryMiami houses four permanent galleries and up to three traveling exhibits, Archives and Research Center, the South Florida Folklife Center, the Education Center, and City Tours program. Each February, HistoryMiami also hosts the annual Miami International Map Fair, the largest map fair in the Western Hemisphere.

Founded as the Historical Museum of Southern Florida in 1940, HistoryMiami is the second oldest cultural institution in South Florida, and is a Smithsonian affiliate. It was accredited by the American Alliance of Museums in 1979.

The Society opened its first museum in 1962. After moving twice, the museum has been located in the Miami-Dade Cultural Center since 1984. The Society and Museum were renamed in HistoryMiami in 2010. In 2014 the museum more than doubled its space when took over the space formerly occupied by the Miami Art Museum in the cultural center. The museum operates a non-circulating library, conducts city tours, and has educated more than 500,000 students in the area's rich history.

HistoryMiami Museum programs include exhibitions, city tours, education, research, collections and publications on the importance of the past in shaping Miami's future. It adopted the HistoryMiami brand name in 2010.

Description 
Located in the Miami-Dade Cultural Plaza in Miami, Florida, HistoryMiami Museum is a  facility and home to more than one million historic images and 30,000 three-dimensional artifacts, including a 1920s trolley car, gold and silver recovered from 17th- and 18th-century shipwrecks, artifacts from Pan American World Airways, and rafts that brought refugees to Miami.

One of the museum's permanent exhibitions, Tropical Dreams: A People’s History of South Florida, covers 12,000 years of history and examines the development of the region and its people against key historic events, including early Native American settlement, the Spanish Exploration period, and World War II up to the present. Also on display is a world-class temporary exhibit, Operation Pedro Pan: The Cuban Children’s Exodus, which explores the largest recorded child refuge in the Western Hemisphere through historic images, oral histories and personal items, such as letters and photographs. HistoryMiami also includes the Archives and Research Center, which contains historic photos and documents useful to scholars, distant learners, industry professionals. The lower level has classrooms used for educational programming and lectures, administrative offices, and part of the museum's object collection.

HistoryMiami is the official repository for all archaeological material recovered in Miami-Dade County.

HistoryMiami publishes Tequesta, an annual scholarly journal focused on South Florida history since 1940.

See also 

 Downtown Miami Historic District
 Lummus Park Historic District
 National Register of Historic Places listings in Miami, Florida
 Timeline of Miami, Florida history

References

External links 

 

Museums in Miami
Museums established in 1940
History museums in Florida
Institutions accredited by the American Alliance of Museums
Smithsonian Institution affiliates
1940 establishments in Florida